Napsiah binti Omar (21 April 1943 – 16 April 2018) was a Malaysian educator and politician.

The daughter of United Malays National Organisation (UMNO) activists, Napsiah was born in Negeri Sembilan. She studied zoology and botany at the Australian National University and received a BSc in nutrition and education from Cornell University. From 1969 to 1982, Napsiah taught at the Universiti Pertanian Malaysia, becoming associate professor and head of the Department of Human Studies.

In 1972, she joined the local branch of the UMNO. She was elected to the Dewan Rakyat representing the constituency of Kuala Pilah (1982-1995; 1999–2004) and was named Deputy Minister of Housing and Local Government. She became divisional head of Wanita UMNO (the women's wing) and was also named to its national executive council. In 1987, she was named Minister of Public Enterprises. In 1990, she was elected deputy leader for Wanita UMNO. Later that year, she became Minister of National Unity and Social Development. In 1995 general election, she did not run for reelection to the parliamentary seat but instead was elected to the Negeri Sembilan State Legislative Assembly of Pilah seat and served as the State Minister for Public Works. In 1999 general election, she contested again the Kuala Pilah parliamentary seat and won for another one term.

Napsiah died on 16 April 2018 at the age of 74 due to liver cancer. She was buried at the Kampung Jawa Muslim Cemetery in Kuala Pilah.

Election results

Honours

Honours of Malaysia
  : 
  Commander of the Order of Loyalty to the Crown of Malaysia (PSM) – Tan Sri  (2007)
  :
  Knight Companion of the Order of Loyalty to Negeri Sembilan (DSNS) – Dato' (1987)

References 

1943 births
2018 deaths
People from Negeri Sembilan
Malaysian people of Malay descent
Malaysian people of Minangkabau descent
Malaysian Muslims
Deaths from liver cancer
Deaths from cancer in Malaysia
United Malays National Organisation politicians
Members of the Dewan Rakyat
Women members of the Dewan Rakyat
Government ministers of Malaysia
Women government ministers of Malaysia
Members of the Negeri Sembilan State Legislative Assembly
Negeri Sembilan state executive councillors
Australian National University alumni
Cornell University alumni
Commanders of the Order of Loyalty to the Crown of Malaysia
20th-century Malaysian women politicians
20th-century Malaysian politicians
21st-century Malaysian women politicians
Women MLAs in Negeri Sembilan